Two regiments of the British Army have been numbered the 124th Regiment of Foot:

124th Regiment of Foot (1762), raised in 1762
124th (Waterford) Regiment of Foot, raised in 1794